David Douglas James Rossdale (born 22 May 1953) was the Bishop of Grimsby, a suffragan bishop (and, from 2010 until 31 January 2013, an area bishop) in the Church of England Diocese of Lincoln.

He was educated at St John's School, Leatherhead, King's College London and Roehampton University. He has a Master of Arts (MA) and a Master of Science (MSc). After a period of study at Chichester Theological College he was ordained in 1981 and began his career with a curacy at St Laurence Upminster, after which he was Vicar of St Luke's, Moulsham, Chelmsford and finally (before his elevation as bishop) Vicar of Cookham and Area Dean of Maidenhead. He retired effective 6 April 2013.

On 11 February 2017, fourteen retired bishops signed an open letter to the then-serving bishops of the Church of England. In an unprecedented move, they expressed their opposition to the House of Bishops' report to General Synod on sexuality, which recommended no change to the Church's canons or practises around sexuality. By 13 February, a serving bishop (Alan Wilson, Bishop of Buckingham) and nine further retired bishops – including Rossdale – had added their signatures; on 15 February, the report was rejected by synod.

Styles
The Reverend David Rossdale (1981–1994)
The Reverend Canon David Rossdale (1994–2000)
The Right Reverend David Rossdale (2000–present)

References

1953 births
People educated at St John's School, Leatherhead
Alumni of Chichester Theological College
Alumni of King's College London
Alumni of the University of Roehampton
21st-century Anglican Church of Canada bishops
Living people
Bishops of Grimsby